Vadym Serhiyovych Olkhovych (born 11 October 2002) is a Ukrainian professional footballer who plays as an attacking midfielder for Ukrainian club Volyn Lutsk.

References

External links
 Profile on Volyn Lutsk official website
 

2002 births
Living people
Footballers from Lutsk
Ukrainian footballers
Association football midfielders
FC Volyn Lutsk players
Ukrainian First League players
Ukrainian Second League players
Sportspeople from Volyn Oblast